The National T20 Cup is a men's professional domestic Twenty20 cricket competition in Pakistan. Established in 2005, it is one of the world's oldest Twenty20 cricket leagues. It was the principal T20 competition in the country until 2016, when the Pakistan Super League (PSL) franchise tournament was introduced. Since 2019–20, the National T20 Cup has been contested by six regional teams, having previously been contested mainly by teams representing the various city, district and area cricket associations. 

The league's team offices are directed out of its head offices located at Gaddafi Stadium in Lahore.

History
The National T20 Cup began in the 2004–05 season as the ABN-AMRO Twenty-20 Cup and quickly became the premier professional Twenty20 cricket league in Pakistan with 14 teams. It was the first T20 cricket league in the world outside of Australia and England.

As ownership of the title sponsor changed, the competition was renamed to the RBS Twenty-20 Cup in 2008–09, and to the Faysal Bank Twenty-20 Cup in 2010–11. In the 2014–15 season, the league was renamed to the Haier T20 Cup.

Sialkot Stallions have been the most successful team, winning the title a total of six times.

Teams
Details of each team are set out below.

Team Results

 Notes
 W = Winner; 
 R = Runner-up;
 (x) = End of league games table position;

Former teams

AJK Jaguars

Dera Murad Jamali Ibexes

FATA Cheetahs

Larkana Bulls

Faisalabad		
FATA
Islamabad
Karachi Blues
Karachi Whites
Lahore Blues
Lahore Whites
Multan
Peshawar
Rawalpindi

Winners and competition details

Sponsorship

Broadcasters

See also

 Quaid-e-Azam Trophy
 Pakistan Cup
 Pakistan Super League
 Kashmir Premier League (Pakistan)

References

Haier T20 Cup
Twenty20 cricket leagues
Pakistani domestic cricket competitions
Professional sports leagues in Pakistan
2004 establishments in Pakistan
Cricket
Sports leagues established in 2004
Recurring sporting events established in 2004